Kim Jin-hyuk (born 3 June 1993) is a South Korean footballer who plays as a forward for Daegu FC.

Career
Kim, born 3 June 1993, joined K League 2 side Daegu FC in January 2015. He plays as a forward. For the 2016 season, he was loaned to Ulsan Dolphins, which played in the Korea National League and helped the club win the championship that year.

Career statistics

Club

Honors and awards

Player
Ulsan Dolphins
 Korea National League Winners (1) : 2016

Daegu FC
 Korean FA Cup Winners (1) : 2018

References

External links 

1993 births
Living people
Association football forwards
South Korean footballers
Daegu FC players
Ulsan Hyundai Mipo Dockyard FC players
K League 1 players
K League 2 players
Korea National League players
Soongsil University alumni